William Robertson Wishart (17 July 1882 – 28 May 1922) was an Australian rules footballer who played with St Kilda in the Victorian Football League (VFL).

References

External links 

1882 births
1922 deaths
Australian rules footballers from Victoria (Australia)
St Kilda Football Club players
Australian military personnel of World War I